Jacob Wilson Parrott (July 17, 1843 – December 22, 1908) was an American soldier and carpenter. He was the first recipient of the Medal of Honor, a new military award first presented by the United States Department of War to six Union Army soldiers who participated in the Great Locomotive Chase in 1862 during the American Civil War (1861–1865).

Biography

Parrott was a native of Fairfield County, Ohio. He joined the United States Army in 1861 as a private in Company K, 33rd Ohio Infantry and first saw combat in the Battle of Ivy Mountain. In April 1862, he volunteered to take part in a daring raid with 21 others (later known as "Andrews' Raiders" because they operated under the command of James J. Andrews). After infiltrating Confederate lines and hijacking the locomotive "General," they were captured and imprisoned. Parrott was severely beaten 110 times in an attempt to make him talk. Parrott and 14 others managed to escape, but only six of them reached friendly lines. He was later exchanged and taken to Washington, D.C. meeting President Abraham Lincoln and was presented with the Medal of Honor by Secretary of War Edwin M. Stanton. He served with the Union Army for the remainder of the war. He was commissioned as a second lieutenant in 1863 after the Battle of Stones River and as a first lieutenant in 1864.

He returned to Kenton, Ohio after the war and remained a cabinet maker and operated a stone quarry south of Kenton, Ohio. Parrott suffered a heart attack and died on December 22, 1908, while walking home from the county courthouse in Kenton, Ohio. He is buried in Grove Cemetery, which is located on the eastern edge of Kenton on the corner of Ohio State Route 309 and the road that now bears his name: Jacob Parrott Boulevard.

Medal of Honor citation

 

Citation:

See also

List of American Civil War Medal of Honor recipients: M–P
List of Andrews Raiders

References

United States Army Medal of Honor recipients
United States Army officers
People from Fairfield County, Ohio
People of Ohio in the American Civil War
1843 births
1908 deaths
American Civil War recipients of the Medal of Honor
People from Kenton, Ohio
Great Locomotive Chase